Chris Blue (born January 15, 1990) is an American soul singer. He is the winner of season 12 of the American talent competition  The Voice at the age of 27.

Life and career

Early life and career beginnings
Blue was born on January 15, 1990, in Glendale, Arizona to Ernest Blue Jr. and Janice Blue-Williams. He is the youngest of seven children. The family moved to  Knoxville, Tennessee, when he was 10 years old. Blue started singing in church at age 3. Blue started preaching at Peace and Goodwill Missionary Baptist Church in Knoxville, Tennessee , and was ordained at the age of 15. He eventually became a worship leader in the Cokesbury United Methodist Church. Choosing a music career from very early on, he formed the Blue Brothers with his siblings and later they appeared on BET's Bobby Jones Gospel show. He won the Voice-Off Knoxville competition in 2015. He toured locally as well as in England, The Bahamas, Jamaica and the Virgin Islands.
Blue also attended Tennessee Temple University in Chattanooga, TN, and was actively involved in the campus worship ministry as well as the campus gospel choir.

The Voice (2017)

Blue auditioned in 2017 to compete in season 12 of The Voice. In the blind auditions, broadcast on March 14, 2017, on NBC, he sang "The Tracks of My Tears" from The Miracles and was the last competitor to perform in the Blind Auditions on episode 7 of the auditions. Alicia Keys was the only judge left with a place in her team and she chose Blue. Blue became part of Team Alicia by default.

He won the title for the season against Blake Shelton's finalist Lauren Duski who finished as runner-up.

The Voice performances – Studio version of performance reached the top 10 on iTunes

Personal life
Blue met his English fiancée Stephanie Dunkley in 2014.

Discography
Singles
 2017: "Money on You"
 2017: "Blue Blood Blues"
 2017: "Humanity"
 2019: "You Are My Heaven"Releases from The Voice
 2017: "The Tracks of My Tears"
 2017: "Adorn" (with RJ Collins)
 2017: "Superstition"
 2017: "Love on the Brain"
 2017: "Love and Happiness"
 2017: "When a Man Loves a Woman"
 2017: "24K Magic"
 2017: "If I Ain't Got You" (with Vanessa Ferguson)
 2017: "Take Me to the King"
 2017: "Diamonds and Pearls" (with Alicia Keys)
 2017: "Rhythm Nation"
 2017: "Money on You"

References

External links
 Official website
 'Voice' Season 12 Champ Chris Blue on Alicia Keys, Battling Doubt: I Almost Didn't Audition, Rolling Stone

Living people
People from Glendale, Arizona
The Voice (franchise) winners
1990 births
Musicians from Knoxville, Tennessee
21st-century American male singers
21st-century American singers